Roberto Rizzo (born 20 October 1961 in San Cesario di Lecce) is a former Italian football midfielder and current manager.

Career

Player
During his career, Rizzo represented U.S. Lecce (two stints) and other teams. He made his Serie A debut on 8 December 1985 with Lecce against Como.

Coach 
Having retired in 1994, Rizzo started as coach of Lecce youth team and won 2 Campionati Primavera (2002–03, 2003–04), 2 Coppe Italia (2001–02, 2004–05) and 2 Supercoppe italiane (2004, 2005).

In January 2006 he was appointed new manager of Lecce in Serie A together with Franco Paleari. He won a Coppa Italia Serie D with Matera in 2009–10.

He was named assistant coach of Lecce, Genoa and Catania in Serie A and Virtus Lanciano in Serie B.

On 24 April 2017 he was confirmed as the new manager of Lecce in Lega Pro. He led Lecce to the play-off quarter-finals and extended his deal for another season.

On 10 September 2017 he quit for personal reasons, after three Serie C matches.

Honors

Manager
Lecce
 Campionato Primavera: 2002–03, 2003–04
 Coppa Italia Primavera: 2001–02, 2004–05
 Supercoppa Primavera: 2004, 2005

Matera
 Coppa Italia Serie D: 2009–10

References

External links
Roberto Rizzo on LegaB.it 

1961 births
Living people
Sportspeople from Lecce
Italian footballers
Serie A players
Serie B players
U.S. Lecce players
ACF Fiorentina players
Association football midfielders
Footballers from Apulia